Palm Springs High School is a public high school for grades 9 through 12 located in Palm Springs, California as part of the Palm Springs Unified School District. It was built in 1938 in an effort led by city pioneer Nellie Coffman.

Athletics
Palm Springs High School was in the Desert Valley League until 2018, when a restructuring saw the creation of the Desert Empire League. The second league was introduced to improve competitive balance, and Palm Springs competes in the Desert Empire League alongside five other teams.

Palm Springs High School football won their first California Interscholastic Federation (CIF) championship in the fall of 2009.

Boys varsity football won the CIF Championship in 2009–2010 and 2014, and has DVL titles 4 out of the last six years in 2008–2009, 2010–2011, 2011–2012,2012-2013 and 2014-2015.

Girls Varsity Volleyball has won 7 Desert Valley League Titles from 2008–2011, and again from 2013-2015. In 2008 they made it to the Quarter Finals of CIF and in 2009, 2010, 2011, and 2013 made it to the Semi-Finals. In 2014, they made it to CIF Finals, and won the championship against Scripps Ranch.

Girls Varsity Soccer won a Desert Valley League title 2008–2009 with nine freshman and then again in 2010–2011 going to the second round in the California Interscholastic Federation with all returning freshman now juniors.

Boys varsity basketball won 4 straight DVL titles from 2010–2013. In 2013, they made it to first round of CIF.

Boys soccer went undefeated in the 2012–2013 season retaining the DVL title, since 1999.

Notable alumni
 Catharine Baker - California State Assemblymember representing California's 16th Assembly District
 Robert Hertzberg – Speaker, California State Assembly
 Alex Hyde-White – actor
 Alejandro Mendoza – democratic socialist politician from Texas
 Eric Rasmussen - physician, TED Prize CEO
 York Shackleton – snowboarder and actor
 Robin Shou – actor and martial artist
 Anthony Claggett - former Major League Baseball player
 Tony Perezchica - former Major League Baseball player

References

External links 
 
 

Buildings and structures in Palm Springs, California
Educational institutions established in 1938
High schools in Riverside County, California
Public high schools in California
1938 establishments in California